Juan Carlos Kopriva Rivera (born 6 November 1964 in Buenos Aires, Argentina) is a former Argentine footballer who has played in clubs of Argentina, Chile, Ecuador, Peru and Uruguay. He is now a Manager of Argentine Primera B Metropolitana club Barracas Central.

Teams
  Sportivo Italiano 1983-1986
  Deportivo Cuenca 1987
  Sportivo Italiano 1988-1989
  Sporting Cristal 1990-1991
  Deportes La Serena 1992
  Everton 1993
  Alianza Lima 1994
  Los Andes 1995
  Tigre 1996
  All Boys 1997
  Racing Club de Montevideo 1998-2000

References
 

1964 births
Living people
Argentine footballers
Argentine expatriate footballers
Racing Club de Montevideo players
Everton de Viña del Mar footballers
Deportes La Serena footballers
Sporting Cristal footballers
Club Alianza Lima footballers
C.D. Cuenca footballers
All Boys footballers
Club Atlético Los Andes footballers
Club Atlético Tigre footballers
Expatriate footballers in Chile
Expatriate footballers in Peru
Expatriate footballers in Ecuador
Expatriate footballers in Uruguay
Association footballers not categorized by position
Footballers from Buenos Aires